The boys' sprint ski mountaineering competition at the 2020 Winter Youth Olympics was held on 13 January at the Villars Winter Park.

Results

Seeding

Elimination round
The top three finishers from each heat advance to the next round.

Quarterfinals

Heat 1

Heat 2

Heat 3

Heat 4

Semifinals

Semifinal 1

Semifinal 2

Final

References

Boys' sprint